Cycloderma is a genus of softshell turtles in the subfamily Cyclanorbinae of the family Trionychidae. The genus is endemic to Africa.

Species
The genus Cycloderma contains the following extant species:
Aubry's flapshell turtle – Cycloderma aubryi 
Zambezi flapshell turtle – Cycloderma frenatum 

Two extinct fossil species are also known: Cycloderma victoriae , from the early Miocene of Kenya; and Cycloderma debroinae , from the late Miocene to the Pliocene of Kenya.

Nota bene: A binomial authority in parentheses indicates that the species was originally described in a genus other than Cycloderma.

References

Bibliography

Further reading
Peters W (1854). "Übersicht der auf seiner Reise nach Mossambique beobachteten Schilkröten ". Bericht über die zur Bekanntmachung geeigneten Verhandlung der Königlich Preussische Akademie der Wissenschaften zu Berlin 1854: 215-216. (Cycloderma, new genus, p. 216). (in German and Latin).

 
Turtle genera
Taxa named by Wilhelm Peters
Taxonomy articles created by Polbot